Mills Olcott Burnham (September 8, 1817 – April 17, 1886) was a Florida settler and member of the Florida House of Representatives from St. Lucia County.

Early life 
Mills Olcott Burnham was born September 8, 1817 in Thetford, Vermont, the son of Timothy Burnham, and Catherine Young.  He was raised in Troy, New York, and served an apprenticeship in the Watervliet Government Arsenal, learning gunsmithing.

Florida settler at Susanna 
He moved to Florida for health reasons in 1837, and brought his wife and two children in August 1839. They originally settled in Garey's Ferry, near Jacksonville.

With the Armed Occupation Act, he filed a claim to settle in the area now known as Ankona, just south of present-day Fort Pierce, which was then called Susanna. He introduced pineapple cultivation, which would later prove to be a significant crop for the area.

He was the first sheriff of what was then St. Lucia County in 1847.

In order to supplement his income, he purchased a schooner, which he named "The Josephine" which he used to become a commercial fisherman. He harvested green sea turtles, and sold them in Charleston. He took good care of his cargo during shipping, and developed a reputation for quality goods. Burnham also raised sheep.

Political career
Burnham was a member of the Florida House of Representatives from 1847–51.

Florida settler at Canaveral 
After hostilities with natives, in August 1849, the Burnham's and most of the other settlers left the colony and fled to safety in St. Augustine. He and his family which now included three more daughters, moved to Canaveral, in 1853. He was the keeper of the Cape Canaveral Light for 30 years beginning in 1853.

Mills died on April 17, 1886, at age 68.

See also 
 Ossian B. Hart
 William F. Russell

References 

1817 births
1886 deaths
Citrus farmers from Florida
Florida pioneers
Florida sheriffs
Gunsmiths
United States Lighthouse Service personnel
Members of the Florida House of Representatives
People from Cape Canaveral, Florida
People from Thetford, Vermont
People from St. Lucie County, Florida
Shepherds
Politicians from Troy, New York
19th-century American politicians